The Te Deum (Op. 22 / H.118) by Hector Berlioz (1803–1869) was completed in 1849. Like the earlier and more famous Grande Messe des Morts, it is one of the works referred to by Berlioz in his Memoirs as "the enormous compositions which some critics have called architectural or monumental music." While the orchestral forces required for the Te Deum are not as titanic as those of the Requiem, the work calls for an organ that can compete on equal terms with the rest of the orchestra. It lasts approximately fifty minutes and derives its text from the traditional Latin Te Deum, although Berlioz changed the word order for dramatic purposes.

Background and premiere
The Te Deum was originally conceived as the climax of a grand symphony celebrating Napoleon Bonaparte. The finished work was dedicated to Albert, Prince Consort, husband of Queen Victoria. Some of the material used by Berlioz in the piece was originally written for his Messe Solennelle of 1824, thought to have been destroyed by the composer but rediscovered in 1991. The first performance of the work was on 30 April 1855, at the Church of Saint-Eustache, Paris; Berlioz conducted an ensemble of 900 or 950 performers.

Structure

Orchestration
The choral movements of the Te Deum are scored for:
 4 flutes
 4 oboes (one doubling on cor anglais)
 4 clarinets (one doubling on bass clarinet)
 4 bassoons
 4 horns
 2 trumpets
 2 cornets
 6 trombones
 2 ophicleides/tubas
 timpani
 4 tenor drums
 bass drum
 5 cymbals
 tenor solo
 2 large 3-part (STB) mixed choirs
 1 large unison children's choir
 Strings
 12 harps
 Organ

There are differences in the orchestration of the non-choral movements. The Prelude calls for a piccolo and 6 snare drums, while the March requires a piccolo saxhorn and 12 harps.

List of movements
Apart from the rarely performed or recorded orchestral Prelude and Marche pour la présentation aux drapeaux (March for the presentation of the colours), there are six movements to this Te Deum, designated by Berlioz as either hymns (Hymne) or prayers (Prière), except for the last movement which he designated as both. These are listed below:

When performed, the Prelude falls between the Tibi omnes and Dignare; the Marche usually comes after the Judex crederis.

Reception
After the first performance in London, in 1887 to celebrate Queen Victoria's Golden Jubilee, The Times commented:

Anton Bruckner, who wrote his own Te Deum in the early 1880s, criticised Berlioz's setting for being too secular, while Camille Saint-Saëns argued that it was well-suited for performance in church.

The second movement, Tibi omnes, was performed by the Sydney Symphony Orchestra, the Sydney Philharmonia Choir, and select members of the Sing 2001 children's choir to accompany the lighting of the Olympic cauldron in the Opening Ceremony of the 2000 Summer Olympics in Sydney, Australia.

Recordings

The recordings conducted by Eliahu Inbal and John Nelson include the two sections usually omitted: the Prelude and the Marche pour la présentation aux drapeaux'

Notes

References

External links

Overview of the Te Deum including history and an analysis of the movements
Discussion and table of Berlioz's self-borrowings, including the two in the Te Deum

Compositions by Hector Berlioz
Berlioz
Music for orchestra and organ
1849 compositions